Magharina  small upper Bajocian genus of ammonite (order Ammonitida) with a small smooth involute shell having a single keel along the venter and extremely simple sutures. Found in Egypt. The type species is M. magharensis.

References

Late Bajocian Ammonites from the Cook Inlet Region, Alaska.  USGS

Ammonitida genera
Oppeliidae
Jurassic ammonites
Bajocian life